"Reckless Paradise" is a song by Canadian punk band Billy Talent. Initially released as the first single for their sixth album, Crisis of Faith, it became the album's second single after the band chose to include their previous single, "Forgiveness I + II", on Crisis of Faith.

Background 
"Reckless Paradise" was primarily written by vocalist, Ben Kowalewicz, and guitarist, Ian D'Sa, about the need for people to be more active in their communities during times of conflict. Kowalewicz detailed the song's message more in an interview with Kerrang!:“We’re in a very interesting time in the world. In my 45 years on this planet, it’s never been more dangerous, volatile or divisive. The four of us are saying we need to come together and put our bullshit aside. We’re only on this planet for a short time together and we need to make sure we treat each other with respect, treat the climate with respect and also realise that the things we’re being sold as truth are not always right. We get a lot of, ‘You’re a political band!’ – we’re not necessarily a political band, but we are socially-minded. This is past the point of left or right-leaning politics.” - Ben Kowalewicz

Release and reception 
"Reckless Paradise" was released on January 24, 2020, with the intention of it being the first single for Crisis of Faith when the album was still set to release that fall. When the album was postponed to 2022, the band chose to include their previous non-album single "Forgiveness I + II" on Crisis of Faith, technically making "Reckless Paradise" the second released single from the album.

Upon release, "Reckless Paradise" was met with mostly positive review. Rob Sayce of Rock Sound called the song "Powerful", while Kaitlin Milligan of Broadway World felt the song delivered "the powerful driving riffs and pointed lyrics the band is famous for." Alternative Press' Koltan Greenwood called the song "a school lesson in melodic yet powerful riffs and supreme vocal range."

Music video 
A music video was released alongside "Reckless Paradise" as part of the band's Forgiveness short film series. The video has since been removed from YouTube, but the band also uploaded a lyric video to the website as well.

Personnel 
Billy Talent

 Ben Kowalewicz - lead vocals, songwriting
 Ian D'Sa - guitars, synthesizers, piano, backing vocals, producer
 Jonathan Gallant - bass, songwriting
 Jordan Hastings - drums, songwriting

Production

 Eric Ratz - engineering
 Ted Jensen - engineering
 Chris Lord-Alge - mixing

Charts

References 

2020 singles
2020 songs
Billy Talent songs
Songs written by Ian D'Sa
Songs written by Benjamin Kowalewicz
Songs written by Jonathan Gallant